Cyrtodactylus annandalei is a species of bent-toed gecko, a lizard in the family Gekkonidae. The species is endemic to Myanmar.

Etymology
The specific name, annandalei, is in honor of Scottish zoologist Nelson Annandale.

Taxonomy
C. annandalei was discovered in 2000 in Myanmar's Alaungdaw Kathapa National Park and described in 2003. It is sympatric with Cyrtodactylus slowinskii.

Habitat
The preferred natural habitat of C. annandalei is forest.

Description

Reproduction
C. annandalei is oviparous.

Conservation status
Since 2018, C. annandalei is listed as Least Concern on the IUCN Red List.

References

Cyrtodactylus
Reptiles described in 2003
Taxa named by Aaron M. Bauer